"When Did You Start to Stop Seeing Things?" is the tenth episode of the 1969 ITC British television series Randall and Hopkirk (Deceased) starring Mike Pratt, Kenneth Cope and Annette Andre. The episode, directed by Jeremy Summers, was first broadcast on 23 November 1969 on the ITV.

Synopsis

Cast 
 Mike Pratt as Jeff Randall
 Kenneth Cope as Marty Hopkirk
 Annette Andre as Jeannie Hopkirk
 Keith Barron as Jarvis
 Basil Dignam as Hepple
 Rosemary Donnelly as Diana
 David Downer as Hinch
 Clifford Evans as Sir Oliver Norenton
 John Garvin as Tully
 Philip James as Holly
 Bessie Love as Mrs. Trotter
 Reginald Marsh as James Laker
 Peter Stephens as Sir Timothy Grange
 David Stoll as Tilvers

Video and DVD release 
The episode was released on VHS and several times on DVD with differing special features.
A Blu-ray edition of this episode has been released by Network along with several significant episodes of several TV series of the 1970 era under the title Retro-Action 1 – The cool age of TV in High Definition.

References

External links 
 

Randall and Hopkirk (Deceased) episodes
1969 British television episodes